Sarvodaya Sanskrit Ashram is a not-for-profit organisation in Uttar Pradesh, India. Its mission is to provide education to all who are deprived of it, to give shelter (Ashraya) to the poor and disabled, and up-liftment of all (Sarvodaya).

The ashram's roots in Sanskriti culture, Sanskrit (a liturgical language of India), and literature, help it revive Sanskrit and the ideas that Sanskriti is based on.

External links
 Website of the ashram
 Students of the ashram

Non-profit organisations based in India